Childers is a rural town and locality in the Bundaberg Region, Queensland, Australia.

Geography
The Isis Highway runs south from the Bruce Highway in Childers.

The township is set on a ridge overlooking fields of rich volcanic soil.

History 
The Childers area was traditionally inhabited by the Dundaburra group who are part of  Kabi Kabi nations in the northernmost area of the Wide Bay Burnett. Their descendants still live in the region.

Europeans first arrived in the area in the 1850s. Pastoralists established properties soon after to raise cattle on the fertile lands. Back then, sugar was (as it is now) the key crop grown in the Isis.

The town was established in 1885. The Isis railway line to Childers opened in 1887 and was pivotal in the early development of the area. Childers Post Office opened on 14 November 1887. The town is reportedly named after Hugh Childers, British statesman, who was the Auditor-General of Victoria in the 1850s.

Circa 1888-1889 an Anglican church was erected in Childers. The present Christ Church Anglican was opened and dedicated on 9 May 1901.

The Childers Uniting Church was originally constructed as the Methodist Church in Horton in 1886. Due to the decline of the Horton township the church was subsequently moved to Childers. It became the Childers Uniting Church in June 1977 following the amalgamation of the Methodist Church into the Uniting Church in Australia in 1977.

Childers Provisional School opened on 28 January 1889. In 1891 it became Childers State School. A secondary department was added in January 1913 and operated until Isis District State High School was established in 1961. A pre-school was added in 1976.

Isis Central Mill Provisional School opened on 23 January 1899. On 1 January 1909 it became Isis Central Mill State School. It closed on 11 December 1987.

A 1902 fire destroyed much of the town centre.

St Joseph's Catholic School was established on 24 January 1926 by the Sisters of St Joseph of the Sacred Heart.

On 28 September 1941 Archbishop James Duhig laid the foundation stone for the Sacred Heart Catholic Church.

The foundation stone of Grace Lutheran Church was laid by Pastor K Scholz on 16 April 1961.

The town made international headlines in June 2000, when an arsonist set fire to the Palace Backpackers Hostel, claiming the lives of 15 tourists. The Palace Building reopened in 2002, and includes a memorial to those lost in the blaze, a Regional Art Gallery and an Information Centre.

The Childers Library opened in 2000 with a major refurbishment in 2014.

The most common responses for religion were No Religion 23.0%, Anglican 21.2% and Catholic 17.8%.

Heritage listings
Childers has a number of heritage-listed sites, including:
 Bruce Highway: Childers Post Office
 Churchill Street: Childers Court House
45 Churchill Street: Isis District War Memorial and Shire Council Chambers
 50 Churchill Street: Queensland National Bank
 54-58 Churchill Street: Shops and Cafe
 55 Churchill Street: Childers RSL Club
 59 Churchill Street: Hotel Childers
 60 Churchill Street: Chemist
 61 Churchill Street: National Australia Bank
 62 Churchill Street: Ellwood & Co Drapery
 63 Churchill Street: Pizzey Memorial Clock
 66-70 Churchill Street: Jeffery's Building
 69 Churchill Street: Childers Ambulance Station
 71 Churchill Street: Federal Hotel
 72 Churchill Street: Palace Hotel
 74-78 Churchill Street: Hardware Store
 75 Churchill Street: Paragon Theatre
 80 Churchill Street: Lloyd's Barber Shop
 82 Churchill Street: Bakery
 84-86 Churchill Street: Kerr's Building
 88-90 Churchill Street: Childers Pharmaceutical Museum
 92-94 Churchill Street: Dittmer's Store
 102-108 Churchill Street: Coronation Building
 106-110 Churchill Street: Grand Hotel, Childers
 Macrossan Street: Christ Church
 18 Macrossan Street: Isis Masonic Lodge
6 North Street: Old Butcher's shop

Economy
Childers is renowned for its heritage character and is classified a National Trust town. The historic colonial buildings of the main street (Bruce Highway) are set amongst large, shady leopard trees. The sugar cane industry features prominently in Childers and has sustained the town over the years. Fruit and vegetable cropping is common on the lands around town. Tourism is a growing industry in Childers, with a number of the preserved historic buildings in town becoming tourist attractions.

Childers acts as a major economic centre in the Wide Bay-Burnett Region and is undergoing considerable growth.

Childers retains much of its historic significance, although many of the streets were redeveloped under a 'Streetscape' project that continues today.

The local tourism organisation "Stay in Childers" is a not for profit incorporated association made up of local businesses.

Facilities 

The Isis Town and Country is the town's local newspaper, available once a week on Thursday. Childers is also served by a monthly community newspaper, the Childers Chit Chat, and commercial FM radio stations Breeze 102.5 and Rebel 106.7.

In addition, the town services the surrounding areas with its small hospital. Childers has its own courthouse.  The town has several emergency service faculties including a police station, ambulance station and fire station housing Fire and Rescue Queensland Staff and Queensland Rural Fire Service volunteers. It also hosts a branch of the State Emergency Service and PCYC Emergency Services Cadets program.

Education 
Childers State School is a government primary (Early Childhood-6) school for boys and girls at Mungomery Street. In 2017, the school had an enrolment of 308 students with 24 teachers (22 full-time equivalent) and 20 non-teaching staff (14 full-time equivalent). It includes a special education program.

Isis District State High School is a government secondary (7-12) school for boys and girls at 3 Ridgway Street. In 2017, the school had an enrolment of 504 students with 48 teachers (46 full-time equivalent) and 33 non-teaching staff (22 full-time equivalent). It includes a special education program.

St Joseph's School is a Catholic primary (Prep-6) school for boys and girls at 40 Churchill Street. In 2017, the school had an enrolment of 75 students with 8 teachers (7 full-time equivalent) and 9 non-teaching staff (5 full-time equivalent).

Amenities 
Childers has many general local servicess, an art gallery (Bundaberg Regional Art Gallery- BRAG) and Information Centre. Cultural entertainment facilitated through the Childers Cultural Centre- a town hall hired through the Bundaberg Regional Council.

Bundaberg Regional Libraries operate a public library at 49 Churchill Street.

The Childers branch of the Queensland Country Women's Association meets at 1 Crescent Street.

Christ Church Anglican Church is at 11 Mcilwraith Street. It is within the Anglican Archdiocese of Brisbane.

Sacred Heart Catholic Church is at 40 Churchill Street. It is within the Roman Catholic Archdiocese of Brisbane.

Childers Uniting Church is at 36 Macrossan Street. It is part of the Uniting Church in Australia.

Grace Lutheran Church is at 226 Churchill Street. It is part of the Lutheran Church of Australia.

The Childers Apostolic Church of Queensland is at 13 Nelson Street. It is part of the Apostolic Church of Queensland.

Childers Wesleyan Methodist Church is at 6 Broadhurst Street. It is part of the Wesleyan Methodist Church of Australia.

Childers Gospel Chapel is at 34 Churchill Street. It is part of the Christian Community Churches of Australia.

Events 
Childers holds a Multicultural Festival once a year on the final weekend in July.  The town also hosts an agricultural show; which in the past was held in early August, but is now hosted in late May or early June.

As a celebration of its cultural heritage, Childers also hosts events in October to celebrate the Crush Festival- a region-wide event to mark the end of the sugar-cane crushing season.

Attractions 
Noakes Lookout is off Rankin Road. However, as at 2013, regrowth of bushland surrounding the lookout has obscured the views and, as the lookout is on private land, there is no guaranteed right of access to the public.

References

External links 

 
 

 
Towns in Queensland
Wide Bay–Burnett
1885 establishments in Australia
Populated places established in 1885
Bundaberg Region
Localities in Queensland